Roger Federer's 2017 tennis season officially commenced on 2 January 2017, with the start of the Hopman Cup, and ended on 18 November 2017, with a loss in the semifinals of the ATP Finals.

This season is regarded by some as one of the greatest comeback seasons of all time. It saw Federer return from an injury shortened 2016 season that saw him drop to world No. 16 in the ATP rankings. This season marked a renaissance and a return to success for Federer, winning two majors, the Australian Open and the Wimbledon Championships, marking the first season since 2009 in which he won multiple majors. Federer won a total of seven titles in the season, the most since 2007, and with a win–loss record of 54–5 his winning percentage was the highest since 2006. With these accomplishments, the season was statistically Federer's most successful in over a decade.

Year summary

Early hard court season

Hopman Cup
After returning from injury, prior to the Australian Open, Federer paired with Belinda Bencic to compete in the Hopman Cup, representing Switzerland. They were knocked out in the round robin stage after winning two out of three ties. Federer played three singles matches during the event, winning two and losing one against Alexander Zverev.

Australian Open

In his first major tournament of the year, Federer progressed all the way to the final, winning over top 10 players Tomáš Berdych, Kei Nishikori, and fellow countryman Stan Wawrinka, to face his archrival Rafael Nadal in the final. Nadal had won all six matches between the two in major tournaments since the Wimbledon final of 2007, including all three of their encounters at the Australian Open. Federer ultimately triumphed after being a break down in the fifth set, winning a record-extending and historic 18th men's singles Grand Slam title and becoming the first man to win at least five singles titles at three different major tournaments each, while denying Nadal's second opportunity to become the first man in the Open Era to win each major in men's singles twice. His previous record of winning at least four titles at three majors was also unmatched.  Federer's campaign in winning the Australian Open 2017 title saw three of his matches going to five sets (fourth round against Nishikori, semi-final against Wawrinka, and final against Nadal) and the five-set major final was the 7th in Federer's career, which broke the record tie with Björn Borg of a career count of 6 five-set major men's singles finals. With the Australian Open 2017 title, Federer's ATP ranking rose from No. 17 to No. 10 and marked his first win over Nadal in a Grand Slam match outside the grass courts of Wimbledon.

Dubai Tennis Championships
Upon his return to Dubai, Federer beat Benoît Paire in the first round, but was upset in the second round by world No. 116 and qualifier Evgeny Donskoy in three sets, despite holding three match points in the second set, being up a break in the third set, and being ahead by four points in the third set tiebreak.

Indian Wells Masters

Federer began the tournament by defeating Stéphane Robert and Steve Johnson in straight sets to set up a meeting with Nadal. Federer won in straight sets, marking the first time he had ever achieved three consecutive wins over the Spaniard. He reached the semifinals with a walkover from Nick Kyrgios due to food poisoning and reached the final after beating Jack Sock in straight sets. He defeated fellow countryman Stan Wawrinka in two sets in the final, to win a record-equaling fifth title in Indian Wells and the 90th title of his career. With this title, Federer's ranking rose from No. 10 to No. 6. This is the seventh time Federer has won a Masters 1000 title without dropping a set, and was only broken once in the entire tournament. At the age of 35, he became the oldest Masters 1000 finalist and winner ever, ahead of Andre Agassi who won the Cincinnati title in 2004 at the age of 34.

Miami Open
After receiving a bye in the first round, Federer won his first match in Miami in straight sets against teenager Frances Tiafoe. He defeated Juan Martín del Potro and Roberto Bautista Agut in straight sets. In the quarterfinals, he edged Tomáš Berdych in a close match, saving two match points in a third-set tiebreak and successfully avenged his fourth round loss to Berdych at this tournament in 2010. In the semi-final, he defeated Australian Nick Kyrgios in three tie-break sets to set up the final against Rafael Nadal. Federer won the match in two sets, capturing his third Sunshine Double, his fourth consecutive victory over Nadal, and his third Miami title but first since 2006. By doing so, he surpassed his previous record in Indian Wells as the oldest man ever to win a Master's 1000 event. Federer's ranking also improved to world No. 4. After his victory, he decided to take rest by skipping the entire clay court season including French Open which he initially planned to play but eventually decided to skip for the second consecutive year in order to prepare for the grass court season.

Grass court season

Stuttgart Open
In his first tour match after winning the Miami final, Federer lost to Tommy Haas in the second round in three sets, having won the first set and held a match point in the second-set tiebreak. This was the first time since the 2002 Wimbledon championships that he had lost his opening match at a grass-court event.

Halle Open
Federer defeated Yūichi Sugita, Mischa Zverev,  Florian Mayer, and Karen Khachanov to reach the final without dropping a set. In the final he defeated Alexander Zverev, securing a record-extending ninth Halle title, and the third which he won without the loss of a set. This made him one of just two men in the Open Era, along with Rafael Nadal, to win the same tournament more than eight times. This title victory also saw Federer equal Nadal's all-time record of 18 ATP 500 titles won.

Wimbledon

During the first round, Federer advanced when his opponent, Alexandr Dolgopolov, withdrew mid-match due to injury. Still, Federer hit and surpassed the 10000 aces mark in his career during his shortened first round match. He then topped Dušan Lajović, Mischa Zverev, and Grigor Dimitrov, reaching an all-time record 15th Wimbledon quarter-final without the loss of a set. Against Milos Raonic whom he had lost to in last year's semifinal, Federer won the match in straight sets with a tiebreaker in the 3rd set to move onto his all-time record 12th Wimbledon semifinal, where he dispatched Tomáš Berdych in straight sets to advance to his 11th Wimbledon final, subsequently setting the record for the highest number of men's singles finals made at a single major. In the final, Federer defeated Marin Čilić in straight sets  to win a record 8th Wimbledon  Gentleman's singles title, breaking his previous tie with William Renshaw and Pete Sampras, and his 19th Grand Slam singles title overall. He became the second male player in the Open Era to win the championships without dropping a set, after Björn Borg in 1976. Following his victory, he also qualified for the 2017 ATP Finals for a record 15th time along with Rafael Nadal where he's won a record six titles.

North American hard court season

Canadian Open
Federer announced that he would return to Montreal for the first time since 2011. Due to the absence of Andy Murray, he was seeded two behind Rafael Nadal, making this the first tournament since 2011 Monte-Carlo Masters where Nadal and Federer were the top two seeds. Federer started his campaign by beating Canadian Peter Polansky in straight sets in the second round. He went on to beat David Ferrer in the third round in 3 sets after recovering from a slow start, improving his career record against Ferrer to 17–0. However, his loss of the first set in that match broke his winning streak of 32 consecutive sets. He defeated Spaniard Roberto Bautista Agut in the quarterfinals in straight sets, improving to 7–0 against Bautista Agut. He defeated Dutchman Robin Haase in the semifinals to book his 6th final of the year. Federer suffered from a recurring back injury in the final, where he lost to Alexander Zverev in straight sets.

Cincinnati Masters
After losing the Montreal final, he traveled to Cincinnati only to pull out of the event due to a recurring back injury, missing a chance to return to No. 1.

US Open

Federer would make his return to New York after a back injury he suffered in Montreal. He was seeded third and drawn in the same half as Rafael Nadal, with both chasing the No.1 spot after the tournament. He faced American teenager Frances Tiafoe in the first round and defeated him in five sets; the first time he was taken to five sets in the opening round at the US Open since 2000. He went on to beat Russian Mikhail Youzhny by playing another five set match and improved to 17–0 in head-to-head matches. It is the first time in his career that he has played five-setters in both the first and second rounds of a major tournament. He easily dispatched Spaniard Feliciano López in the third round with a straight sets win to improve his record against him to 13–0. During his victory, Federer moved into second place in the all-time aces list surpassing Croatian Goran Ivanisevic's 10,131 tally. He went on to improve to 12–0 in head-to-head matches by beating German Philipp Kohlschreiber in straight sets to set up an encounter with Argentine Juan Martín del Potro in the quarterfinals, which he lost in 4 sets. After the encounter with del Potro, Federer reiterated that his back was healthy, but stated that he was "not in a safe place" going into the match and explained that his shot accuracy throughout the tournament had not been reliable enough.

Asian swing

Shanghai Masters
Federer began his campaign in Shanghai by defeating Diego Schwartzman, Alexandr Dolgopolov, and Richard Gasquet in straight sets.
After prevailing in a 3-set semifinal match against Juan Martín del Potro, Federer defeated Rafael Nadal in the final in their fourth encounter of the season to equal Ivan Lendl for the second-most titles of the open era with 94. He beat his great rival for the fifth consecutive time, their 4 encounters in 2017 and the Basel 2015 Final. He also extended his own record as the oldest male player ever to win a Masters 1000 tournament. The win over Nadal was Federer's 350th match won at a Masters 1000 tournament.

European indoor hard court season

Swiss Indoors
Upon his return to Basel, Federer defeated Frances Tiafoe and Benoît Paire in straight sets. With this win Federer moved to the quarterfinals where he defeated Adrian Mannarino in three sets, then beat David Goffin in the semis to set up a final clash with Juan Martín del Potro. In the final Federer came from a set down, after losing a closely contested tiebreaker, to win in three sets. It was his 95th career title and his 8th in Basel.

Paris Masters
Federer was expected to play the Paris Masters, but withdrew before his first match citing a back injury.

ATP Finals

Federer qualified for the ATP finals as the second seed and won all three of his round-robin matches against Jack Sock, Alexander Zverev, and Marin Čilić. At the semifinals, he was defeated by David Goffin in three sets despite being a set up, ending his 2017 season.

All matches
This table chronicles all the matches of Roger Federer in 2017, including walkovers (W/O) which the ATP does not count as wins or losses.

Singles matches

 

|}

Doubles matches

Hopman Cup matches

Singles

Mixed doubles

Exhibition matches

Singles

Doubles

Schedule

Singles schedule

Doubles schedule

Yearly records

Head-to-head matchups

ATP and Grand Slam sanctioned matches
Roger Federer has a  ATP match win–loss record in the 2017 season. Bold indicates player was ranked top 10 at time of at least one meeting. The following list is ordered by number of wins:

  Rafael Nadal 4–0
  Tomáš Berdych 3–0
  Frances Tiafoe 3–0
  Mischa Zverev 3–0
  Juan Martín del Potro 3–1
   Roberto Bautista Agut 2–0
  Marin Čilić 2–0
  Alexandr Dolgopolov 2–0
  Nick Kyrgios 2–0
  Benoît Paire 2–0
  Jack Sock 2–0
  Stan Wawrinka 2–0
  Alexander Zverev 2–1
  Grigor Dimitrov 1–0
  David Ferrer 1–0
  Richard Gasquet 1–0
  Robin Haase 1–0
  Steve Johnson 1–0
  Karen Khachanov 1–0
  Philipp Kohlschreiber 1–0
  Dušan Lajović 1–0
  Feliciano López 1–0
  Adrian Mannarino 1–0
  Florian Mayer 1–0
  Jürgen Melzer 1–0
  Kei Nishikori 1–0
  Peter Polansky 1–0
  Sam Querrey 1–0
  Milos Raonic 1–0
  Stéphane Robert 1–0
  Noah Rubin 1–0
  Diego Schwartzman 1–0
  Yūichi Sugita 1–0
  Mikhail Youzhny 1–0
  David Goffin 1–1
  Evgeny Donskoy 0–1
  Tommy Haas 0–1

ITF sanctioned matches
While these are official sanctioned matches per the ITF, the ATP does not count them in their totals. Bold indicates player was ranked top 10 at time of at least one meeting. The extra ITF matches are as follows:
  Daniel Evans 1–0
  Richard Gasquet 1–0
  Alexander Zverev 0–1

Finals

Singles: 8 (7 titles, 1 runner-up)

Team competitions: 1 (1 title)

Earnings
Bold font denotes tournament win

 Figures in United States dollars (USD) unless noted.

Awards
Comeback Player of the Year
Stefan Edberg Sportsmanship Award
Record thirteenth award in career (seventh consecutive)
ATPWorldTour.com Fans' Favourite
Record fifteenth consecutive award in career
BBC Overseas Sports Personality of the Year
Record fourth award in career
Laureus World Sports Award for Sportsman of the Year (2018)
Record fifth award in career
Laureus World Sports Award for Comeback of the Year (2018)

See also
 2017 ATP World Tour
 2017 Novak Djokovic tennis season
 2017 Andy Murray tennis season
 2017 Rafael Nadal tennis season
 2017 Stan Wawrinka tennis season

References

External links
  
 ATP tour profile

Roger Federer tennis seasons
Federer
2017 in Swiss tennis
2017 in Swiss sport